Datchworth is a village and civil parish between the towns of Hertford, Stevenage and Welwyn Garden City in the county of Hertfordshire, England. Sited on the Roman road from St Albans to Puckeridge, the village has examples of Saxon clearings in several locations. Datchworth has a village green where there are two pubs (The Plough and The Tilbury) and a sports club. There are three other pubs in the parish: The Horns at Bulls Green, The White Horse at Burnham Green and Three Horse Shoes at Hooks Cross. In the 2001 Census the population was 1,065, increasing to 1,524 at the 2011 Census.

Origins
The name Datchworth is thought to originate from a Saxon lord called Daecca (pronounced Datcher), who settled here around the year 700 AD. 'Worth' comes from the Anglo-Saxon word worthig, which means enclosure.

However, Datchworth was certainly occupied well before 700 AD. There are two large Belgic sites, only one of which has been partly investigated. Much of the parish boundary still follows the old Belgic ditches.

History
The arrival of the Normans gave Datchworth a written record in the Domesday Book. This included an account of the occupants and land values in the 11th century.

Standing at the eastern side of Datchworth Green is the whipping post.  Its last recorded use was on 27 July 1665 when two 'vagabonds' were publicly flogged. Stocks stood near the post too, but there is no trace of them now.  The stocks are thought to have been removed in 1899, however, there are stocks located close to  All Saints' Church.

During the Second World War the last enemy-action incident of any kind on British soil occurred at 09:00 on 29 March 1945 when a V-1 flying bomb struck a nearby field in Woolmer Green

Notable people
Film critic Barry Norman and his novelist wife Diana Narracott lived in Datchworth for many years, and both their children were born in their house there.

References

External links 

Datchworth website

Villages in Hertfordshire
Civil parishes in Hertfordshire
East Hertfordshire District